Alicia Coppola is an American actress. She became known for playing Lorna Devon in the soap opera Another World from 1991 to 1994. Afterwards, she made regular and guest star appearances in various television series, notably Jericho and Blood & Treasure and appeared in films such as National Treasure: Book of Secrets.

Early life
Born in Huntington, New York, Coppola graduated from the Kent School in Kent, Connecticut, in 1986 and earned a bachelor's degree in political anthropology and philosophy from New York University in 1990. She is the sister of film producer Matthew Coppola and cousin of film producer Denise Di Novi. She does not appear to be related to the Coppola family of actors and filmmakers.

Career
Coppola began her career as a hostess on the MTV game show Remote Control. In 1991, she joined the cast of the soap opera Another World playing the vixen Lorna Devon, the long-lost daughter of popular character Felicia Gallant. She played the role until 1994. 

Her better-known TV jobs include a recurring role on Trinity (1998–99), a starring role on the American remake of the British comedy Cold Feet (1999), and top billing on the TNT drama Bull (2000). She played Leesa in a 1999 episode of Sports Night, appeared briefly as Lt. Stadi in the pilot episode of Star Trek: Voyager, played a cannibalistic murderer on CSI: Crime Scene Investigation, a widow who marries her late husband's killer on Law & Order: Criminal Intent, and appeared several times as JAG lawyer Lieutenant Commander Faith Coleman on JAG and NCIS (she also appeared in an episode of NCIS: Los Angeles, but as a different character). In 2003, she starred alongside Gary Oldman and Ving Rhames in the film Sin, and played a Hollywood rehab stereotype by the name of Toni Stark on Dawson's Creek. She played a power company public relations representative in a 2004 episode of Monk. Coppola also took on the unusual role of a female serial killer agreeing to help catch her copycat in the 2005 episode of Crossing Jordan titled "Road Kill".  She had a recurring role on NBC's American Dreams, playing the role of Nancy. She appeared on Two and a Half Men as Dr. Michelle Talmadge, in the episode "Woo-Hoo, a Hernia Exam!" (2005).

Coppola played a short role on the Fox television series Bones in 2005 as Joy Deaver in the episode, "The Girl in the Fridge".

Coppola also had a role as a Muslim intelligence analyst working for the Los Angeles branch of the Counter Terrorist Unit (CTU), in a single episode of 24, named Azara ("1–2 am" during Day 4). All four of her scenes were cut from the broadcast episode, but are restored as extras on the Day 4 DVD. In them, she discovers a lead in the investigation which is originally dismissed by fellow analyst Edgar Stiles, who suspects her because of her religion. Edgar later apologizes to her when her lead turns out to be important.

Starting in the fall of 2006, she appeared in the recurring role of IRS Agent Mimi Clark in the post-apocalyptic drama Jericho. She became a series regular in February 2007. She was an FBI agent in National Treasure: Book of Secrets, also directed by  Jericho executive producer Jon Turteltaub.

Coppola appeared on the season 2 episode "Little Angels" of CBS' NCIS: Los Angeles, playing FBI agent Amy Rand, an expert on kidnapping cases. She has also appeared on The Nine Lives of Chloe King as Valentina, the leader of the Mai. She appeared on Monk in "Mr. Monk and the Blackout" as the power plant public relations spokesperson and as Monk's date. She appeared in the MTV series Teen Wolf as the powerful Alpha werewolf Talia Hale. In 2014, she appeared on Sons of Anarchy as Mildred Treal in the episode "Faith and Despondency". Coppola returned to daytime soap operas for the first time in twenty years when she took a recurring role on CBS's The Young and the Restless in spring 2016. Coppola appeared as Dr. Tammy Brunner in a 2017 episode of Designated Survivor.

Personal life
Coppola is married to actor, writer, and producer Anthony Michael Jones, best known for appearing in General Hospital as Father Coates, a recurring occasional role which he played in 11 episodes from 2002 through 2010. They have three daughters.

Filmography

References

External links

Living people
20th-century American actresses
21st-century American actresses
Actresses from New York (state)
American people of Italian descent
American film actresses
American soap opera actresses
American television actresses
Kent School alumni
New York University alumni
People from Huntington, New York
Year of birth missing (living people)